Phyllidia elegans, also known as the elegant phyllidia, is a species of sea slug, a dorid nudibranch, a shell-less marine gastropod mollusk in the family Phyllidiidae. It is found in shallow water in the Red Sea and the tropical Indo-Pacific region.

Distribution 
This species has been found in Indonesia, Malaysia, Thailand, the Andaman Sea, Myanmar, the Red Sea, the Mariana Islands, north Sulawesi, Vanuatu and Papua New Guinea.

Description
This animal can be distinguished by a pale-coloured foot having a single median longitudinal black line on the sole, light pink dorsal tubercles commonly tipped in yellow, and black lines on the lateral margins of the sole.

References

External links
 
 

Phyllidiidae
Molluscs of the Indian Ocean
Molluscs of the Pacific Ocean
Fauna of the Red Sea
Gastropods described in 1869